Luk Yu is a tea house and dim sum restaurant located on Stanley Street, in the Central area of Hong Kong, established in 1933.

It is known for its colonial style, adherence to tradition and loyal long-time customers, for whom the entire first floor is unofficially reserved.

The tea house gets its name from the Tang Dynasty poet Lu Yu who wrote The Classic of Tea which describes the history and culture of Chinese tea. (Luk Yu is the Cantonese pronunciation of Lu Yu.)

Luk Yu also sells its branded Luk Yu tea bags in local stores and in the UK.

Murder of Harry Lam
On 30 November 2002, businessman Harry Lam Hon-lit was shot dead at point-blank range while eating breakfast at Luk Yu.  His murderer was Yang Wen, a hitman hired by a Hong Kong triad boss.

See also
 Cantonese restaurant

References

Tea houses
Chinese restaurants in Hong Kong
Central, Hong Kong
Cantonese restaurants
Triad (organized crime)